Kiyokawa is a Japanese surname. Notable people with the surname include:

, Japanese embroidery artist
, Japanese footballer and manager
, Japanese businessman, sports administrator and swimmer
, Japanese actor and voice actor
, Japanese footballer
, Japanese bobsledder

Japanese-language surnames